Kusheh (also Romanized as Kūsheh; also known as Kosheh) is a village in Shahrabad Rural District, Shahrabad District, Bardaskan County, Razavi Khorasan Province, Iran. At the 2006 census, its population was 1,768, in 419 families.

References 

Populated places in Bardaskan County